Austin Springs is an unincorporated community in Weakley County, Tennessee, in the United States.

History
The community was named for the Austin brothers who started a hotel at the site of a mineral spa.

References

Unincorporated communities in Weakley County, Tennessee
Unincorporated communities in Tennessee